The 200 metres sprint events began in 1976 Summer Paralympics where there were two categories for both men and women.

Men's medal summaries

Ambulant athletes

Amputee athletes

Blind athletes

Wheelchair athletes

Women's medal summaries

Ambulant athletes

Amputee athletes

Blind athletes

Wheelchair athletes

See also
Athletics at the Olympics
200 metres at the Olympics

References

Athletics at the Summer Paralympics
200 metres
Paralympic medalists in athletics (track and field)